Oisy may refer to:

Places
 Billy-sur-Oisy, a commune in the Nièvre department in central France
 Oisy, Aisne, a commune in the Aisne department in Picardy in northern France
 Oisy, Nièvre, a commune in the Nièvre department in central France
 Oisy, Nord, a commune in the Nord department in northern France
 Oisy-le-Verger, a commune in the Pas-de-Calais department in the Nord-Pas-de-Calais region of France

See also
 Hugh I of Oisy (died circa 1111), the castellan of the town of Cambrai and a famous rebel against the authority of the bishops of the city